The fourth season of American Idol premiered on January 18, 2005, and continued until May 25, 2005. It was hosted by Ryan Seacrest. Randy Jackson, Paula Abdul and Simon Cowell also returned to judge. Carrie Underwood won the season with approximately 500 million votes cast in the season and 37 million for the finale.  Underwood has since gone on to become an eight-time Grammy-winning country megastar. It was also the first season of the series to be aired in high definition.

Changes

While in the past seasons celebrity guest judges have been invited to participate during the competition, this was the first season where guest judges were invited to participate in the auditions. The music celebrities featured were:
 January 18 (Washington auditions), Mark McGrath of Sugar Ray
 January 25 (New Orleans auditions), Gene Simmons of KISS
 January 26 (Las Vegas auditions), Kenny Loggins
 February 1 (Cleveland auditions), LL Cool J
 February 2 (San Francisco audition), Brandy

Where there were four judges present, three yeses were required for the auditioner to proceed on to Hollywood.

It is also the first season in which the age limit was raised to 28, in order to increase variety. Among those who benefited from this new rule were Constantine Maroulis, Bo Bice, Scott Savol and Nadia Turner.

Regional auditions

Auditions for Season 4 started on August 4, 2004, in Cleveland, Ohio. An audition was originally planned for Anchorage, Alaska, but that was canceled about a month before due to possible schedule conflict as a result of hurricanes affecting the Orlando auditions. Auditions were held from August to October 2004, and over 100,000 people attended the auditions for the first time.

The audition episodes featured the Molfetta twins multiple times.  They first auditioned in New Orleans but both failed, Rich Molfetta tried again in Las Vegas and got through to the Hollywood, but J.P. Molfetta failed in his audition in San Francisco.

Hollywood week
There were 193 contestants in the Hollywood rounds.  They were split into two groups to perform on separate day at the Orpheum Theatre in Los Angeles.  The contestants first chose from a list of 12 songs selected by the producers.  They were separated into groups of boys and girls but they performed solo with piano accompaniment and back-up singers.  Those who failed were eliminated after all in the group performed.  95 contestants were eliminated after this round but one, Marlea Stroman, left on her own free will and became the first contestant  ever to choose to leave the American Idol competition.  The remaining 97 contestants competed in the second round which featured group performances.  The songs for the groups were Four Tops's "I Can't Help Myself", The Temptations' Get Ready, Barry Manilow's "Jump Shout Boogie", The Marvelettes's "Please Mr. Postman" and The Supremes' "Where Did Our Love Go".  75 remained after this round.

In the last round they performed a capella.  After their performance, the contestants were divided into 4 groups in separate rooms.  Two groups were eliminated and the number of contestants was cut to 44.

Green mile
After further deliberation by the judges, 24 semi-finalists, 12 women and 12 men, were then selected.  At Pasadena Civic Center, each contestant took the elevator from their holding room to the floor above, and in a walk that would later be dubbed the "green mile", to see the judges who would then reveal their fate to them.

Semi-finals
Because of the highly unbalanced finals in season 3 where female contestants formed the clear majority (8 to 4) of the final 12, rules for the semifinals were changed so as to give an equal number of male and female finalists. From this season to season seven, and again for season nine, 12 men and 12 women competed separately on consecutive nights, with 2 of each gender being voted off each week in the result shows until 12 finalists were left, 6 men and 6 women.

Color key:

Top 24
Males

Females

Top 20
Males

Females

Top 16
Males

Females

Finalists 

Carrie Underwood (born March 10, 1983, in Muskogee, Oklahoma, 21 years old at the start of the season) is a farm girl from Checotah, Oklahoma and she auditioned in St. Louis, Missouri with Bonnie Raitt's "I Can't Make You Love Me".  She performed Candi Staton's "Young Hearts Run Free" in Hollywood week but forgot part of the lyrics.
Bo Bice (born November 1, 1975, in Huntsville, Alabama, 29 years old during the show) is from Helena, Alabama, and auditioned in Orlando, Florida with The Allman Brothers Band's "Whipping Post".  He performed The Box Tops's "The Letter", The Temptations' "Get Ready" for the group round in the Hollywood week.  He wanted to introduce rock to American Idol.  Prior to Idol he performed professionally and released an album with his band Purge.
Vonzell Solomon (born March 18, 1984, in Baxley, Georgia, aged 20 at the start of the season) is from Fort Myers, Florida and auditioned in Orlando, Florida with Aretha Franklin's "Chain of Fools".  She is proficient in the martial arts.  She performed Whitney Houston's "How Will I Know" in the Hollywood round. She performed as a guest singer for Postmodern Jukebox.
Anthony Fedorov (born May 4, 1985, in Yalta, Ukraine, aged 19  at the start of the season) is from Trevose, Pennsylvania and auditioned in Cleveland, Ohio with Jon Secada's "Angel".  He had difficulty breathing when he was little and had a tracheotomy about which his doctor expressed concern that he might not be able to speak again.  He performed Diana Ross' "When You Tell Me That You Love Me" and reprised Jon Secada's "Angel" during Hollywood week.
Scott Savol (born April 30, 1976, in Cleveland, Ohio, aged 28 at the start of the season) is from Shaker Heights, Ohio and auditioned in Cleveland with The Carpenters' "Superstar".  He performed Four Tops's "I Can't Help Myself" in the group round in Hollywood week.
Constantine Maroulis (born September 17, 1975, in Brooklyn, New York, 29 in the show) is from New York and auditioned in Washington DC with Aerosmith's "Cryin'".  He wanted to bring an edgy New York City's rock and roll to American Idol.  Prior to Idol he was in a band Pray for the Soul of Betty and worked in musical theater. In the Hollywood week, he performed The Box Tops's "The Letter" and Four Tops's "I Can't Help Myself" for the group round.
Anwar Robinson (born April 21, 1979, in Newark, New Jersey, 25 during the show) is from East Orange, New Jersey and auditioned in Washington, DC.  He was a music teacher before Idol.  He performed Four Tops's "I Can't Help Myself" for the group round in the Hollywood.
Nadia Turner (born January 11, 1977, in Miami, Florida, 28 during the show) auditioned in San Francisco with Aretha Franklin's "Until You Come Back to Me".
Nikko Smith (born April 28, 1982, in San Diego, California, 22 during the show) is from St. Louis, Missouri and auditioned there with his birth name Osborne Smith.  He performed Stevie Wonder's "All I Do".  In Hollywood, he performed The Temptations' Get Ready in Bo Bice's group.
Jessica Sierra (born November 11, 1985, in Tampa, Florida, aged 19 during the show) auditioned in Orlando with Etta James' "At Last".  She worked as a nanny before Idol.  In the Hollywood week, she performed Diana Ross' "When You Tell Me That You Love Me"
Mikalah Gordon (born January 14, 1988, in Las Vegas, Nevada, 17 years old at the show) auditioned in Las Vegas with Ella Fitzgerald's "Lullaby of Broadway" and Lauryn Hill's "Killing Me Softly with His Song".  She performed Dusty Springfield's "You Don't Have to Say You Love Me" in the Hollywood rounds.
Lindsey Cardinale (born February 5, 1985, in Hammond, Louisiana, 19 years old at the start of the season) is from Ponchatoula, Louisiana and auditioned in New Orleans with Karla Bonoff's "Standing Right Next to Me".  She performed The Supremes' "Ain't No Mountain High Enough" during Hollywood week.

Finals 
In this season, guest judges were introduced in some episodes, and sometimes the mentor joined as judges.

In the result shows, the bottom two vote-getters reprised their performances before the elimination was announced, or only the eliminated one performed after the result is revealed.

Color key:

Top 12 – 1960s

Top 11 – Billboard Number Ones

Note 1: This song hit number one on the R&B chart.

Top 10 – 1990s

Top 9 – Classic Broadway

Top 8 – Songs from Birth Year

Top 7 – 1970s Dance Music

Top 6 – 21st century

Top 5 – Leiber & Stoller/Current week Billboard chart

Top 4 – Country/Gamble & Huff

Top 3 –  Clive's Choice, Idols' Choice, Judges' Choice
Each contestant sang three songs.

Judge Simon Cowell believed that Bice would have won the season, were he able to save his a cappella rendering of "In a Dream" for his final performance.

Finale – Simon Fuller's choice, Contestant's choice & Winner's single 
Each contestant sang three songs.

The fourth-season finale featuring Bo Bice and Carrie Underwood aired  May 25, 2005. It featured appearances by former auditioners, and celebrity cameos by Kenny G, Rascal Flatts, David Hasselhoff, Kenny Wayne Shepherd, George Benson, Billy Preston, Babyface and Lynyrd Skynyrd. The winner of the competition was Carrie Underwood, who would eventually become the second "Idol" winner to sweep all three major music awards (American Music, Billboard, and Grammy Award) in a single season (for 2006–07).

In a nod to the "Diana knew she'd been eliminated by the performance order" controversy of Idol 3, neither contestant sang the winner's single, "Inside Your Heaven", before the results were announced.

Underwood's first single, "Inside Your Heaven", debuted at number one on the Billboard Hot 100 on June 14, 2005, and had first-week sales of 170,000 copies. One week later, runner-up Bo Bice released his version of the song, which debuted at number two.

Elimination chart
Color key:

DialIdol

The computer program DialIdol, which allows voters to autodial their votes and uses the dialing results to make predictions about the eliminations, was in development during season 4. It was finished by Top 6 week and was used to predict the voting results from the Top 6 to Top 2. However, the dialing program was not made available to the general public until season 5.

Controversy
During the season, Corey Clark, a season two contestant who was disqualified for having an undisclosed arrest record, alleged in an interview on ABC's Primetime Live that he had an affair with Paula Abdul while on the show. The finale show included a parody segment spoofing the alleged scandal.

Votefortheworst.com, which campaigned voting for Scott Savol, made headlines when Savol outlasted Constantine Maroulis and made it into the final five.

On the Top 11, the show had a voting error in which three of the contestants had their numbers mixed up. The Wednesday show which was supposed to be the elimination night made fans revote again as the numbers were fixed and Thursday was the elimination night.

Bo Bice was revealed to have been arrested on a felony cocaine possession charge in June 2001 at a strip club in Madison County, Ala., and was also arrested two years later for marijuana possession, public intoxication, and possession of drug paraphernalia.

Scott Savol was also revealed to have been convicted of a misdemeanor charge of disorderly conduct for domestic violence. However, no action was taken against either of them by the show producers because they had revealed their misdemeanors in advance.

U.S. Nielsen ratings 
Season 4 of American Idol had an overall average viewership of 26.8 million and was the top show for the 2004–2005 TV season. Its Tuesday episodes averaged 27.32 million (ranked first) while the Wednesday episodes averaged 26.07 million  (ranked third). It also drove Fox, for the first time ever, to become the top network in the 18-to-49 demographic for the season.

Note 1: The Top 11 Wednesday night was a repeat performance night due to a mix-up in the phone numbers for the contestants.  The result show was moved to Thursday.

Music releases

The compilation album for this season was performed by the top twelve finalists.

Source: Idolsmusic.com

See also
 American Idols LIVE! Tour 2005

References

External links
 Official American Idol Contestants Website
 

American Idol seasons
2005 American television seasons